Abbas Ali Çetin (1914– 26 August 1975) was a Turkish-Azerbaijani politician, lawyer and judge.

Life 
He was born in 1907 in Yerevan. His father was Abdulali, his mother was Gozal Hanım. During the First World War, after the Armenian attacks on Azerbaijanis in Yerevan, his family was forced to migrate to the Ottoman Empire. Abbas Ali Çetin graduated from Faculty of Law of Ankara University and worked in different state body as a lawyer and judge.

He was elected to the parliament from Kars in 1950 and 1965. He was a member of Republican People's Party, Democrat Party and Justice Party.

Death 
He died on 26 August 1975.

See also 
 Tezer Taşkıran

References

1914 births
1975 deaths
Turkish people of Azerbaijani descent
Emigrants from the Russian Empire to the Ottoman Empire
Members of the 9th Parliament of Turkey
Members of the 13th Parliament of Turkey
Politicians from Yerevan
Ankara University alumni

Deputies of Kars